Tropidomantis tenera is a species of praying mantis found in Thailand, Malaysia, Indonesia (Sumatra, Java, Flores, Sumba, Sulawesi, Borneo), and the Philippines. Females reach about 2.5  cm in length, and males are smaller.

Tropidomantis tenera has a yellow median line starting from the thorax and ending at the tip of the abdomen.

See also
List of mantis genera and species

References

Nanomantidae
Mantodea of Southeast Asia
Insects described in 1860